The Drees–Van Schaik cabinet, also called the First Drees cabinet was the executive branch of the Dutch Government from 7 August 1948 until 15 March 1951. The cabinet was formed by the christian-democratic Catholic People's Party (KVP) and Christian Historical Union (CHU), the social-democratic Labour Party (PvdA) and the conservative-liberal People's Party for Freedom and Democracy (VVD) after the election of 1948. The cabinet was a centrist grand coalition and had a substantial majority in the House of Representatives with Labour Leader Willem Drees serving as Prime Minister. Prominent Catholic politician Josef van Schaik a former Minister of Justice served as Deputy Prime Minister and Minister without portfolio for the Interior.

The cabinet served during final years of the post-war 1940s and the first years of the turbulent 1950s. Domestically the beginning of the recovery and rebuilding following World War II started with the Marshall Plan, it was also to implement several major social reforms to social security, welfare, child benefits and education. Internationally the beginning of the decolonization of the Dutch East Indies started following the Indonesian National Revolution and the forming of the Netherlands New Guinea following the West New Guinea dispute. The cabinet suffered several major internal and external conflicts including multiple cabinet resignations, the cabinet fell 29 months into its term on 24 January 1951 following a disagreement in the coalition over the handling of the New Guinea policy and the cabinet continued in a demissionary capacity until it was replaced with the First Drees cabinet on 15 March 1951.

Term
This coalition had a 76% representation in the second chamber of parliament. It had to have a broad basis for the change in constitution that was required to make the Dutch East Indies independent, resulting in the new country Indonesia (in December 1949). In 1948 a second politionele actie (litt: politional action, but actually a military intervention) was embarked upon, but ended under international pressure. The rejection of a VVD-motion over New Guinea in 1951 led to the fall of the cabinet. However, no elections were held and a new cabinet was formed with the same parties, Drees I.

In 1949, the Netherlands entered the NATO. In the same year several alterations of the German border took place.

Cabinet Members

Trivia
 Eight cabinet members had previous experience as scholars and professors: Piet Lieftinck (Financial and Business Economics), Jan van den Brink (Public Economics and Economical Statistics), Dolf Joekes (Labour Law), Theo Rutten (Applied Psychology), Joris in 't Veld (Public Administration), Wim van der Grinten (Fiscal Law), Piet Muntendam (Social Medicine) and Aat van Rhijn (Fiscal Law).
 Three cabinet members (later) served as Party Leaders and Lijsttrekkers: Willem Drees (1946–1946) of the Social Democratic Workers' Party and (1946–1958) of the Labour Party, Dirk Stikker (1946–1948) of the Freedom Party and Dolf Joekes (1938–1946) of the Free-thinking Democratic League.
 Three cabinet members would later be granted the honorary title of Minister of State: Willem Drees (1958), Josef van Schaik (1951) and Jo Cals (1966).
 Four cabinet members later served as in high-profile international functions: Dirk Stikker (Secretary General of NATO), Piet Lieftinck (Executive Director of the International Monetary Fund and the World Bank), Sicco Mansholt (European Commissioner and President of the European Commission) and Maan Sassen (European Commissioner).

References

External links
Official

  Kabinet-Drees I Parlement & Politiek
  Kabinet-Drees-Van Schaik Rijksoverheid

Cabinets of the Netherlands
1948 establishments in the Netherlands
1951 disestablishments in the Netherlands
Cabinets established in 1948
Cabinets disestablished in 1951
Grand coalition governments